The Macau national under-20 football team is the under-20 association football team of Macau. It is controlled by the Macau Football Association.

Competitive record

FIFA U-20 World Cup

AFC U-20 Asian Cup

See also
 Sports in Macau

u20
Asian national under-20 association football teams